A solid-state laser is a laser that uses a gain medium that is a solid, rather than a liquid as in dye lasers or a gas as in gas lasers. Semiconductor-based lasers are also in the solid state, but are generally considered as a separate class from solid-state lasers, called laser diodes.

Solid-state media

Generally, the active medium of a solid-state laser consists of a glass or crystalline "host" material, to which is added a "dopant" such as neodymium, chromium, erbium, thulium or ytterbium. Many of the common dopants are rare-earth elements, because the excited states of such ions are not strongly coupled with the thermal vibrations of their crystal lattices (phonons), and their operational thresholds can be reached at relatively low intensities of laser pumping.

There are many hundreds of solid-state media in which laser action has been achieved, but relatively few types are in widespread use. Of these, probably the most common is neodymium-doped yttrium aluminum garnet (Nd:YAG). Neodymium-doped glass (Nd:glass) and ytterbium-doped glasses or ceramics are used at very high power levels (terawatts) and high energies (megajoules), for multiple-beam inertial confinement fusion.

The first material used for lasers was synthetic ruby crystals. Ruby lasers are still used for a few applications, but they are not common because of their low power efficiencies. At room temperature, ruby lasers emit only short pulses of light, but at cryogenic temperatures they can be made to emit a continuous train of pulses.

Some solid-state lasers can also be tunable using several intracavity techniques, which employ etalons, prisms, and gratings, or a combination of these. Titanium-doped sapphire is widely used for its broad tuning range, 660 to 1080 nanometers. Alexandrite lasers are tunable from 700 to 820 nm and yield higher-energy pulses than titanium-sapphire lasers because of the gain medium's longer energy storage time and higher damage threshold.

Pumping

Solid state lasing media are typically optically pumped, using either a flashlamp or arc lamp, or by laser diodes. Diode-pumped solid-state lasers tend to be much more efficient and have become much more common as the cost of high-power semiconductor lasers has decreased.

Mode locking

Mode locking of solid-state lasers and fiber lasers has wide applications, as large-energy ultra-short pulses can be obtained. There are two types of saturable absorbers that are widely used as mode lockers: SESAM, and SWCNT. Graphene has also been used. These materials use a nonlinear optical behavior called saturable absorption to make a laser create short pulses.

Current applications and developments

Solid-state lasers are being developed as optional weapons for the F-35 Lightning II, and are reaching near-operational status, as well as the introduction of Northrop Grumman's FIRESTRIKE laser weapon system. In April 2011 the United States Navy tested a high energy solid state laser. The exact range is classified, but they said it fired "miles not yards".

Uranium-doped calcium fluoride was the second type of solid state laser invented, in the 1960s. Peter Sorokin and Mirek Stevenson at IBM's laboratories in Yorktown Heights (US) achieved lasing at 2.5 µm shortly after Maiman's ruby laser.

The U.S. Army is preparing to test a truck-mounted laser system using a 58 kW fiber laser. The scalability of the laser opens up use on everything from drones to massive ships at different levels of power. The new laser puts 40 percent of available energy into its beam, which is considered very high for solid-state lasers. Since more and more military vehicles and trucks are using advanced hybrid engine and propulsion systems that produce electricity for applications like lasers the applications are likely to proliferate in trucks, drones, ships, helicopters and planes.

See also
 Disk laser
 Laser construction
 Solid-state dye lasers

References